Barrio Mexican Kitchen & Bar, or simply Barrio, is a Mexican restaurant in Seattle, in the U.S state of Washington. The restaurant is owned by Heavy Restaurant Group, which previously operated a second Barrio location in Bellevue.

Description 
Barrio is a Mexican restaurant on Capitol Hill. Thrillist says the business serves agave and "offers a modern approach to Mexican cuisine that's inspired by Pacific Northwestern flavors and seasonal ingredients -- from freshly caught seafood and locally sourced beef to wild mushrooms and vegan cheeses". In 2014, Sara Billups of Eater Seattle described Barrio as a "stylish Capitol Hill Mexican spot". In 2015, the website's Megan Hill said the restaurant has a "slightly upscale twist on Mexican flavors".

The brunch menu has included carnitas and pancakes, pork belly benedict, burritos, and tacos. The happy hour menu has included the Triple T special, which has a taco, a can of Tecate, and tequila. The drink menu has also included beer, mezcal, a prickly pear Bellini, and a Bloody Mary. Margarita varieties have included blood orange, a reposado infused with ghost pepper, and a blanco tequila with tamarind.

History 
The restaurant is operated by Heavy Restaurant Group (also known as Heavy Restaurants). In addition to the Capitol Hill location, the company previously operated a Barrio restaurant in Bellevue for approximately two years, until closing in 2011.  Plans were to convert the Bellevue restaurant into an event space, and 75 percent of workers there were "reassigned" to other Heavy restaurants.

In 2022, nine restaurant workers walked out in protest of the tipping structure.

Reception 
Thrillist says the restaurant offers "around the clock hours (read: brunch through late-night service, every weekend), central location, and extensive outdoor seating area that keep locals and visitors sufficiently sated by tacos and tequila. It's what mezcal dreams are made of, morning, noon, and night."

In 2013, Eater Seattle readers voted to include Barrio in a list of "18 Best Under the Radar Brunches". Sara Billups included the restaurant in the website's 2014 list of "15 Seattle Happy Hours to Try Now". In 2015, Perry recommended Barrio in Eater Seattle's list of 20 Seattle bars for mourning the Super Bowl loss. The website's Gabe Guarente included the restaurant in a 2019 list of "8 Super Cool Seattle Spots to Drink Margaritas".

See also 

 List of Mexican restaurants

References

External links 

 
 Barrio Mexican Kitchen & Bar at The Infatuation
 Barrio at Zomato

Capitol Hill, Seattle
Mexican restaurants in Seattle
Mexican restaurants in Washington (state)
Restaurants in Bellevue, Washington